Zengena Lake is a crater lake located at  in the Awi Zone of the Amhara Region in Ethiopia. It is situated between the towns of Injibara and Kessa, only 200 m from the Addis Ababa-Bahir Dar highway at an elevation of 2500 m. The diameter of the lake is roughly 1 km. With a maximum depth of 166 m, it is the second deepest lake in Ethiopia after Lake Shala. Its rim is made of unconsolidated ash deposits. Zengena Lake is most likely a maar lake formed by volcanic explosion and collapse.

Notes

References
Tenalem Ayenew (2009). Natural Lakes of Ethiopia. Addis Ababa University Press. Addis Ababa.

Volcanic crater lakes
Lakes of Ethiopia
Amhara Region
Maars of Ethiopia